Ingrid Sundberg (born 25 October 1948 in Stockholm, Sweden) is a retired Swedish alpine skier who competed in the 1968 Winter Olympics.

External links
 sports-reference.com
 

1948 births
Swedish female alpine skiers
Alpine skiers at the 1968 Winter Olympics
Olympic alpine skiers of Sweden
Living people
Sportspeople from Stockholm
20th-century Swedish women